The Medicine Show is the fifteenth studio album by American singer-songwriter Melissa Etheridge. The album was released on April 12, 2019, by ME Records and Concord Records.

Recording and release
The Medicine Show follows a 2016 collection of soul covers MEmphis Rock and Soul that connected with Etheridge's roots as a music fan. While promoting that release, she became concerned about the political climate of the United States and felt compelled to write new music that reflected the historic times after the 2016 United States presidential election.

Critical reception

The Medicine Show received generally positive reviews from critics. At Metacritic, which assigns a normalized rating out of 100 to reviews from critics, the album received an average score of 66, which indicates "generally favorable reviews", based on 4 reviews.

Track listing

Credits
Musicians
 Melissa Etheridge – lead vocals and backing vocals, acoustic and electric guitars, keyboards, co-producer
 John Shanks – acoustic and electric guitars, keyboards, producer
 Chris Chaney – bass (tracks 1–10)
 Paul Lamalfa – bass guitar (tracks 11–13), synthesizer, engineer
 Max Hart – keyboards (tracks 2, 4, 5, 7–9)
 Victor Indrizzo – drums, percussion

Production
 Melissa Etheridge, John Shanks – production 
 Keith Gretlein – engineer
 Joe LaPorta – mastering
 Michael H. Brauer – mixing

Charts

References

2019 albums
Melissa Etheridge albums
Albums produced by John Shanks
Concord Records albums